Schinnerer is a surname. Notable people with the surname include:

Adolf Schinnerer (1876–1949), German artist
Mark C. Schinnerer (1899–1978), American politician